Teracotona uhrikmeszarosi is a moth in the  family Erebidae. It was described by Szent-Ivany in 1942. It is found in Tanzania.

References

Natural History Museum Lepidoptera generic names catalog

Endemic fauna of Tanzania
Moths described in 1942
Spilosomina